Hickory Hollow Natural Area Preserve is a  Natural Area Preserve located in Lancaster County, Virginia. The preserve's mixed pine-hardwood forests, ravines, and swampland form a habitat for various songbirds, wild turkeys, and a rare species of plant. The swamp is an example of a globally rare natural community known as a "coastal plain basic seepage swamp", and supports a high level of biological diversity.

Hickory Hollow Natural Area Preserve is owned by the Northern Neck Audubon Society, who purchased the land from Lancaster County in 1999. It was dedicated as a Natural Area Preserve on July 12, 2000.

The preserve is open to the public, and contains a parking area and hiking trails.

See also
 List of Virginia Natural Area Preserves

References

External links
 Northern Neck Audubon Society
 Virginia Department of Conservation and Recreation: Hickory Hollow Natural Area Preserve

Virginia Natural Area Preserves
Protected areas of Lancaster County, Virginia
Protected areas established in 2000
2000 establishments in Virginia